Eugene Covered Bridge, also known as County Bridge No. 75, is a historic Burr Arch Truss covered bridge located in Eugene Township, Vermillion County, Indiana.  It was built in 1873, and is a single span covered timber bridge.  It measures 180 feet long and 16 feet wide.  The bridge spans the Big Vermilion River.

It was listed on the National Register of Historic Places in 1994.

See also
Brouilletts Creek Covered Bridge
Newport Covered Bridge
Possum Bottom Covered Bridge

References

Covered bridges on the National Register of Historic Places in Indiana
Bridges completed in 1873
Transportation buildings and structures in Vermillion County, Indiana
National Register of Historic Places in Vermillion County, Indiana
Road bridges on the National Register of Historic Places in Indiana
Wooden bridges in Indiana
Burr Truss bridges in the United States